The Virginia Range is a mountain range of western Nevada, primarily within Storey County, and extending east into Lyon County.  The range is named after James Finney, "Old Virginny", an early discoverer of gold associated with the Comstock Lode.

Geography
The mountain range forms a portion of the drainage divide between the Truckee River (north) and the Carson River (south).  Truckee Meadows and the Washoe Valley are to the west, and the Lahontan Valley is to the east. It is associated with the Flowery Range.

Several paths lead into the Virginia Range. The highest peak is Mount Davidson at  7864 ft / 2397 m, near Virginia City, Nevada. Other nearby peaks are Mount Bullion at 7682 ft / 2341 m and Ophir Hill at 7782 ft / 2372 m.

Flora
Jeffrey pine (Pinus jeffreyi) is the dominant species at higher elevations. Other trees in the range include the Single-leaf Pinyon Pine (Pinus monophylla) and Utah Juniper (Juniperus osteosperma).

Mining history
For the notable 1860s silver strike and mining town in the Virginia Range, see: 
Comstock Lode
Virginia City, Nevada
Virginia City Historic District (Virginia City, Nevada)
National Register of Historic Places in Storey County, Nevada

References

External links
 Geology of the Virginia City Quadrangle, Nevada by GEORGE A. THOMPSON, 1950
 Topology map

Mountain ranges of Nevada
Mountain ranges of Storey County, Nevada
Mountain ranges of Lyon County, Nevada
Mountain ranges of the Great Basin
Virginia City, Nevada